{{safesubst:#invoke:RfD|||month = March
|day = 17
|year = 2023
|time = 03:29
|timestamp = 20230317032900

|content=
REDIRECT Sauce poivrade

}}